Belinda is an unincorporated community in Lucas County, in the U.S. state of Iowa.

History
Belinda's post office operated from 1858 to 1908. Belinda was also the site of J.E. Wood's General Store. 

The community's population was 40 in 1890, 44 in 1900, and 25 in 1918.

References

Unincorporated communities in Lucas County, Iowa
Unincorporated communities in Iowa